Paul Parkinson may refer to:

 Paul Parkinson (Scouting)
 Paul Bonifacio Parkinson (born 1991), Italian-Canadian figure skater
 Paul Parkinson (sprinter)